Neurogomphus dissimilis is a species of dragonfly in the family Gomphidae. It is found in Malawi, Namibia, Zambia, and Zimbabwe. Its natural habitat is rivers.

References

Gomphidae
Taxonomy articles created by Polbot
Taxobox binomials not recognized by IUCN